Marion Bowman (born 1955) is a British academic working on the borders of religious studies and folklore and ethnology. She is Senior Lecturer in Religious Studies, The Open University. 

Bowman is a long-standing researcher into New Age and alternative spiritualities. Her research focus is predominantly contemporary spirituality in the UK and Europe, particularly "the practices and beliefs of individuals both within and on the margins of institutional religion".

Education 
Bowman began her university education at Glasgow University but moved to Lancaster University to study under Prof Ninian Smart.

Bowman completed her MA in Folklore at Memorial University, Newfoundland: her dissertation was on devotion to St Gerard Majella in Newfoundland.  She completed her PhD at the University of Glamorgan in 1998 on 'Vernacular Religion and Contemporary Spirituality: Studies in Religious Experience and Expression'.

Career 
From 1990 to 2000 Bowman was based at Bath Spa University in the department of Study of Religions.

In 2000 Bowman joined the Religious Studies department at The Open University. She was Head of Department between 2010 and 2013. 

Bowman has carried out a long term study of Glastonbury, seeing it as a sight of "significant pilgrimage destination and microcosm of contemporary spirituality and vernacular religiosity".

Bowman is a member of the Steering Committee of the Baron Thyssen Centre for the Study of Ancient Material Religion, based in the Classical Studies Department at the Open University. She was also a Co-Investigator on the Arts Humanities Research Council (AHRC) funded project Pilgrimage and England’s Cathedrals, Past and Present, which ran from 2014-2018.

The research of Bowman and Open University colleagues into alternative religions has been seen to have a number of impacts: both at an academic level in influencing research agendas but also in influencing a more positive public awareness of practitioners of alternative religions.

Recognition 
Bowman has been a visiting lecturer or professor at a number of European universities, including the University of Oslo, Norway; University of Bayreuth, Germany; University of Pecs, Hungary and University of Tartu, Estonia.

Bowman is currently vice-president of theology and religious studies UK. She is a former president of the British Association for the Study of Religions and a former Vice-President of the European Association for the Study of Religions. 

Between 2002 and 2005, Bowman served as president of the Folklore Society: her Presidential Lectures derived from her research into Glastonbury and Newfoundland.

Selected publications 

 Bowman, Marion (1993-04-01). "Reinventing the Celts". Religion. 23 (2): 147–156. doi:10.1006/reli.1993.1013. ISSN 0048-721X.
Bowman, Marion (1994). "The commodification of the Celt: New Age/Neo-pagan consumerism". In: The marketing of tradition: perspectives on folklore, tourism and the heritage industry. Teri Brewer. Enfield Lock: Hisarlik. 1994. . OCLC 35555136.
 Bowman, Marion (1995-05-01). "The noble savage and the global village: Cultural evolution in new age and neo‐pagan thought". Journal of Contemporary Religion. 10 (2): 139–149. doi:10.1080/13537909508580734. ISSN1353-7903.
 Bowman, Marion (1998-01-01). "Belief, Legend and Perceptions of the Sacred in Contemporary Bath". Folklore. 109 (1–2): 25–31. doi:10.1080/0015587X.1998.9715958. ISSN 0015-587X.
 Bowman, Marion; Sutcliffe, Steven (eds) (2000) Beyond New Age: exploring alternative spirituality. Edinburgh: Edinburgh University Press. . OCLC 43969544.
Bowman, Marion (2001). The People’s Princess: Religion and Politics in the Mourning for Diana. In: Barna, Gabor ed. Politics and Folk Religion. Bibliotheca religionis popularis Szegediensis, (6). Szeged, Hungary: Department of Ethnology, University of Szeged. . OCLC 61726708.
Bowman, Marion (2002). Contemporary Celtic spirituality. In: Pearson, Joanne ed. Belief beyond boundaries: Wicca, Celtic spirituality and the New Age. Religion today: tradition, modernity and change (5). Aldershot, UK: Ashgate, pp. 55–101. . OCLC 48098557.
 Bowman, Marion (2003-03-01). "Vernacular religion and nature: The "Bible of the Folk" tradition in Newfoundland". Folklore. 114 (3): 285–295. doi:10.1080/0015587032000145333. ISSN 0015-587X.
 Bowman, Marion (2004-12-01). "Procession and possession in Glastonbury: continuity, change and the manipulation of tradition". Folklore. 115 (3): 273–285. doi:10.1080/0015587042000284266. ISSN 0015-587X.
 Bowman, Marion (2006-08-01). "The Holy Thorn Ceremony: Revival, Rivalry and Civil Religion in Glastonbury". Folklore. 117 (2): 123–140. doi:10.1080/00155870600707805. ISSN 0015-587X.
 Bowman, Marion (2009-06-01). "Learning from experience: The value of analysing Avalon". Religion. 39 (2): 161–168. doi:10.1016/j.religion.2009.01.016. ISSN 0048-721X.
 Bowman, Marion; Valk, Ülo (eds) (2014) Vernacular Religion in Everyday Life : Expressions of Belief.  London: Routledge. . OCLC 893333268.
 Bowman, Marion (2014) "Far from the madding crowd: Glastonbury's spiritual side". The Conversation. Retrieved 2021-04-01.
 Bowman, Marion (2016-07-27). "The contented collector: materiality, relationality and the power of things". Material Religion. 12 (3): 384–386. doi:10.1080/17432200.2016.1192159. ISSN 1743-2200.
 Coleman, Simon; Bowman, Marion (2019-01-02). "Religion in cathedrals: pilgrimage, heritage, adjacency, and the politics of replication in Northern Europe". Religion. 49 (1): 1–23. doi:10.1080/0048721X.2018.1515341. ISSN 0048-721X.
 Bowman, Marion; Sepp, Tiina (2019-01-02). "Caminoisation and Cathedrals: replication, the heritagisation of religion, and the spiritualisation of heritage". Religion. 49 (1): 74–98. doi:10.1080/0048721X.2018.1515325. ISSN 0048-721X.
Bowman, Marion (2020-09-01). ""Rehabilitating" Pilgrimage in Scotland: Heritage, Protestant Pilgrimage, and Caledonian Caminos". Numen. 67 (5–6): 453–482. doi:10.1163/15685276-12341598. ISSN1568-5276.

References

External links 
"Sacred Spaces in Liminal Places: Airport Chapels and Religion in Transit" Marion Bowman delivering the Don Yoder Lecture at the American Folklore Society Annual Meeting in Salt Lake City, Utah, 2004
"Vernacular Religion" Podcast from the Religious Studies Project featuring David G Robertson interviewing Marion Bowman about her research into everyday experiences of religion, 2012.
"Sacred Spaces in Secular Places - From Airports to Agoratopias" Marion Bowman speaking at the Aboagora Symposium 2012: The Power of the Sacred and the Secular, 15 August 2012
"Marion Bowman’s ethnological sensation" Video for the International Society for Ethnology and Folklore on how Marion Bowman came to carry out research on Glastonbury, 2016.

1955 births
Living people
Memorial University of Newfoundland alumni
Presidents of the Folklore Society